William Simmonds Meers (27 March 1844 – 12 July 1902) was an English amateur cricketer who played in one first-class cricket match for Kent County Cricket Club.

Meers was born at Stoke in Kent in 1844. He made his only appearance for the Kent side in 1866 against Sussex at Tunbridge Wells. He is also known to have played two matches for the Gentlemen of Kent during the 1860s. He died at Horsham in Sussex in 1902 aged 58.

References

External links

1844 births
1902 deaths
English cricketers
Kent cricketers